In mathematics, especially in the field of algebra, a polynomial ring or polynomial algebra is a ring (which is also a commutative algebra) formed from the set of polynomials in one or more indeterminates (traditionally also called variables) with coefficients in another ring, often a field.

Often, the term "polynomial ring" refers implicitly to the special case of a polynomial ring in one indeterminate over a field. The importance of such polynomial rings relies on the high number of properties that they have in common with the ring of the integers.

Polynomial rings occur and are often fundamental in many parts of mathematics such as number theory, commutative algebra, and algebraic geometry. In ring theory, many classes of rings, such as unique factorization domains, regular rings, group rings, rings of formal power series, Ore polynomials, graded rings, have been introduced for generalizing some properties of polynomial rings.

A closely related notion is that of the ring of polynomial functions on a vector space, and, more generally, ring of regular functions on an algebraic variety.

Definition (univariate case)

The symbol  is called an indeterminate or variable. (The term of "variable" comes from the terminology of polynomial functions. However, here,  has not any value (other than itself), and cannot vary, being a constant in the polynomial ring.)

Two polynomials are equal when the corresponding coefficients of each  are equal.

This can be used for an equivalent definition of polynomial rings.

These operations are defined according to the ordinary rules for manipulating algebraic expressions. Specifically, if 

and

then

and

where ,

and

The scalar multiplication is the special case of the multiplication where  is reduced to its constant term (the term that is independent of ); that is

Therefore, polynomial rings are also called polynomial algebras.

A straightforward use of the operation rules shows that the expression 

is then an alternate notation for the sequence 
.

Terminology
Let

be a nonzero polynomial with 

A constant polynomial is either the zero polynomial, or a polynomial of degree zero.

A nonzero polynomial is monic if its leading coefficient is 

and, over a field,  or more generally an integral domain,

Two polynomials are associated if either one is the product of the other by a unit.

Over a field, every nonzero polynomial is associated to a unique monic polynomial.

A polynomial is irreducible if it is not the product of two non-constant polynomials, or equivalently, if its divisors are either constant polynomials or have the same degree.

Polynomial evaluation 

Let  be a field or, more generally, a commutative ring, and  a ring containing . This element is obtained by carrying on in  after the substitution the operations indicated by the expression of the polynomial. For example, if we have 

we have 

(in the first example , and in the second one ). Substituting  for itself results in 

explaining why the sentences "Let  be a polynomial" and "Let  be a polynomial" are equivalent.

The polynomial function defined by a polynomial  is the function from  into  that is defined by  If  is an infinite field, two different polynomials define different polynomial functions, but this property is false for finite fields. For example, if  is a field with  elements, then the polynomials  and  both define the zero function.

In other words,  has the following universal property:
For example, where .

Univariate polynomials over a field 
If  is a field, the polynomial ring  has many properties that are similar to those of the ring of integers  Most of these similarities result from the similarity between the long division of integers and the long division of polynomials.

Most of the properties of  that are listed in this section do not remain true if  is not a field, or if one considers polynomials in several indeterminates.

Like for integers, the Euclidean division of polynomials has a property of uniqueness. This makes  a Euclidean domain. However, most other Euclidean domains (except integers) do not have any property of uniqueness for the division nor an easy algorithm (such as long division) for computing the Euclidean division.

The Euclidean division is the basis of the Euclidean algorithm for polynomials that computes a polynomial greatest common divisor of two polynomials. Here, "greatest" means "having a maximal degree" or, equivalently, being maximal for the preorder defined by the degree. In particular, two polynomials that are not both zero have a unique greatest common divisor that is monic (leading coefficient equal to ).

The extended Euclidean algorithm allows computing (and proving) Bézout's identity.

and

In the case of the integers the same property is true, if degrees are replaced by absolute values, but, for having uniqueness, one must require .

So 

The unique factorization property results from Euclid's lemma. In the case of integers, this is the fundamental theorem of arithmetic. In other terms  is a unique factorization domain. If  is the field of complex numbers, the fundamental theorem of algebra asserts that a univariate polynomial is irreducible if and only if its degree is one. In this case the unique factorization property can be restated as: every non-constant univariate polynomial over the complex numbers can be expressed in a unique way as the product of a constant, and one or several polynomials of the form ; this decomposition is unique up to the order of the factors. For each factor,  is a root of the polynomial, and the number of occurrences of a factor is the multiplicity of the corresponding root.

Derivation

The (formal) derivative of the polynomial

is the polynomial

In the case of polynomials with real or complex coefficients, this is the standard derivative.  The above formula defines the derivative of a polynomial even if the coefficients belong to a ring on which no notion of limit is defined. The derivative makes the polynomial ring a differential algebra.

The existence of the derivative is one of the main properties of a polynomial ring that is not shared with integers, and makes some computations easier on a polynomial ring than on integers.

Square-free factorization

Lagrange interpolation

Polynomial decomposition

Factorization 

Moreover these algorithms are efficient, as their computational complexity is a quadratic function of the input size.

The situation is completely different for factorization: the proof of the unique factorization does not give any hint for a method for factorizing. Already for the integers, there is no known algorithm running on a classical computer for factorizing them in polynomial time. This is the basis of the RSA cryptosystem, widely used for secure Internet communications.

Over the complex numbers, the irreducible factors (those that cannot be factorized further) are all of degree one, while, over the real numbers, there are irreducible polynomials of degree 2, and, over the rational numbers, there are irreducible polynomials of any degree.

The existence of a factorization algorithm depends also on the ground field. In the case of the real or complex numbers, Abel–Ruffini theorem shows that the roots of some  polynomials, and thus the irreducible factors, cannot be computed exactly. Therefore, a factorization algorithm can compute only approximations of the factors. Various algorithms have been designed for computing such approximations, see Root finding of polynomials.

On the other hand, over the rational numbers and over finite fields, the situation is better than for integer factorization, as there are factorization algorithms that have a polynomial complexity. They are implemented in most general purpose computer algebra systems.

Minimal polynomial

That is,  
 

The notation ambiguity is generally harmless, because of the isomorphism.

The term minimal is motivated by the fact that its degree is minimal among the degrees of the elements of the ideal.

There are two main cases where minimal polynomials are considered.

The cyclotomic polynomials are the minimal polynomials of the roots of unity.

In linear algebra, the  square matrices over  form an associative -algebra of finite dimension (as a vector space). Therefore the evaluation homomorphism cannot be injective, and every matrix has a minimal polynomial (not necessarily irreducible). By Cayley–Hamilton theorem, the evaluation homomorphism maps to zero the characteristic polynomial of a matrix. It follows that the minimal polynomial divides the characteristic polynomial, and therefore that the degree of the minimal polynomial is at most .

Quotient ring
However, as each equivalence class contains exactly one polynomial of minimal degree, another construction is often more convenient.

The ring  is a field if and only if  is an irreducible polynomial. Conversely, if  is reducible, then there exist polynomials  of degrees lower than  such that  ; so  are nonzero zero divisors modulo , and cannot be invertible.

For example, the standard definition of the field of the complex numbers can be summarized by saying that it is the quotient ring 
 

Let  be an algebraic element in a -algebra . By algebraic, one means that  has a minimal polynomial . The first ring isomorphism theorem asserts that the substitution homomorphism induces an isomorphism of  onto the image  of the substitution homomorphism.

Modules 

The structure theorem for finitely generated modules over a principal ideal domain applies to
K[X], when K is a field. This means that every finitely generated module over K[X] may be decomposed into a direct sum of a free module and finitely many modules of the form , where P is an irreducible polynomial over K and k a positive integer.

Definition (multivariate case)

Given  symbols  called indeterminates, a monomial (also called power product) 

is a formal product of these indeterminates, possibly raised to a nonnegative power. As usual, exponents equal to one and factors with a zero exponent can be omitted. In particular, 

The tuple of exponents  is called the multidegree or exponent vector of the monomial. For a less cumbersome notation, the abbreviation

is often used.

A polynomial in these indeterminates, with coefficients in a field, or more generally a ring,  is a finite linear combination of monomials

The degree of a nonzero polynomial is the maximum of the degrees of its monomials with nonzero coefficients.

The set of polynomials in  denoted  is thus a vector space (or a free module, if  is a ring) that has the monomials as a basis.

If the ring  is commutative,  is also a commutative ring.

Operations in 

Addition and scalar multiplication of polynomials are those of a vector space or free module equipped by a specific basis (here the basis of the monomials). Explicitly, let

where  if  and  if  Moreover, if one has  for some  the corresponding zero term is removed from the result.

The multiplication is 

In particular, the product of two monomials is a monomial whose exponent vector is the sum of the exponent vectors of the factors.

The verification of the axioms of an associative algebra is straightforward.

Polynomial expression

A polynomial expression is an expression built with scalars (elements of ), indeterminates, and the operators of addition, multiplication, and exponentiation to nonnegative integer powers.

As all these operations are defined in  a polynomial expression represents a polynomial, that is an element of  The definition of a polynomial as a linear combination of monomials is a particular polynomial expression, which is often called the canonical form, normal form, or expanded form of the polynomial. 
Given a polynomial expression, one can compute the expanded form of the represented polynomial by expanding with the distributive law all the products that have a sum among their factors, and then using commutativity (except for the product of two scalars), and associativity for transforming the terms of the resulting sum into products of a scalar and a monomial; then one gets the canonical form by regrouping the like terms.

The distinction between a polynomial expression and the polynomial that it represents is relatively recent, and mainly motivated by the rise of computer algebra, where, for example, the test whether two polynomial expressions represent the same polynomial may be a nontrivial computation.

Categorical characterization 

As it is the case for every universal property, this characterizes the pair  up to a unique isomorphism.

This may also be interpreted in terms of adjoint functors. More precisely, let  and  be respectively the categories of sets and commutative -algebras (here, and in the following, the morphisms are trivially defined). There is a forgetful functor  that maps algebras to their underlying sets. On the other hand, the map  defines a functor  in the other direction.

That is, there is a bijection

This may be expressed also by saying that polynomial rings are free commutative algebras, since they are free objects in the category of commutative algebras. Similarly, a polynomial ring with integer coefficients is the free commutative ring over its set of variables, since commutative rings and commutative algebras over the integers are the same thing.

Graded structure

Univariate over a ring vs. multivariate 
A polynomial in  can be considered as a univariate polynomial in the indeterminate  over the ring  by regrouping the terms that contain the same power of  that is, by using the identity

which results from the distributivity and associativity of ring operations.

This means that one has an algebra isomorphism

that maps each indeterminate to itself. (This isomorphism is often written as an equality, which is justified by the fact that polynomial rings are defined up to a unique isomorphism.)

In other words, a multivariate polynomial ring can be considered as a univariate polynomial over a smaller polynomial ring. This is commonly used for proving properties of multivariate polynomial rings, by induction on the number of indeterminates.

The main such properties are listed below.

In this section,  is a commutative ring,  is a field,  denotes a single indeterminate, and, as usual,  is the ring of integers.

 If  is a Noetherian ring, then  where "" denotes the Krull dimension.
In particular,  and 

Several indeterminates over a field
Polynomial rings in several variables over a field are fundamental in invariant theory and algebraic geometry. Some of their properties, such as those described above can be reduced to the case of a single indeterminate, but this is not always the case. In particular, because of the geometric applications, many interesting properties must be  invariant under affine or projective transformations of the indeterminates. This often implies that one cannot select one of the indeterminates for a recurrence on the indeterminates.

Bézout's theorem, Hilbert's Nullstellensatz and Jacobian conjecture are among the most famous properties that are specific to multivariate polynomials over a field.

Hilbert's Nullstellensatz 

The Nullstellensatz (German for "zero-locus theorem") is a theorem, first proved by David Hilbert, which extends to the multivariate case some aspects of the fundamental theorem of algebra.

The Nullstellensatz, has three main versions, each being a corollary of any other. Two of these versions are given below. For the third version, the reader is referred to the main article on the Nullstellensatz.

The first version generalizes the fact that a nonzero univariate polynomial has a complex zero if and only if it is not a constant.

The second version generalizes the fact that the irreducible univariate polynomials over the complex numbers are associate to a polynomial of the form  The statement is: If  is algebraically closed, then the maximal ideals of  have the form 

Bézout's theorem

Bézout's theorem may be viewed as a multivariate generalization of the version of the fundamental theorem of algebra that asserts that a univariate polynomial of degree  has  complex roots, if they are counted with their multiplicities.

For stating the general case, and not considering "zero at infinity" as special zeros, it is convenient to work with homogeneous polynomials, and consider zeros in a projective space. In this context, a projective zero of a homogeneous polynomial  is, up to a scaling, a -tuple   of elements of  that is different form , and such that .

Jacobian conjecture

Generalizations

Polynomial rings can be generalized in a great many ways, including polynomial rings with generalized exponents, power series rings, noncommutative polynomial rings, skew polynomial rings, and polynomial rigs.

 Infinitely many variables 

One slight generalization of polynomial rings is to allow for infinitely many indeterminates.  Each monomial still involves only a finite number of indeterminates (so that its degree remains finite), and each polynomial is a still a (finite) linear combination of monomials.  Thus, any individual polynomial involves only finitely many indeterminates, and any finite computation involving polynomials remains inside some subring of polynomials in finitely many indeterminates. This generalization has the same property of usual polynomial rings, of being the free commutative algebra, the only difference is that it is a free object over an infinite set.

One can also consider a strictly larger ring, by defining as a generalized polynomial an infinite (or finite) formal sum of monomials with a bounded degree. This ring is larger than the usual polynomial ring, as it includes infinite sums of variables. However, it is smaller than the ring of power series in infinitely many variables. Such a ring is used for constructing the ring of symmetric functions over an infinite set.

Generalized exponents

A simple generalization only changes the set from which the exponents on the variable are drawn.  The formulas for addition and multiplication make sense as long as one can add exponents: .  A set for which addition makes sense (is closed and associative) is called a monoid.  The set of functions from a monoid N to a ring R which are nonzero at only finitely many places can be given the structure of a ring known as R[N], the monoid ring of N with coefficients in R.  The addition is defined component-wise, so that if , then  for every n in N.  The multiplication is defined as the Cauchy product, so that if , then for each n in N, cn is the sum of all aibj where i, j range over all pairs of elements of N which sum to n.

When N is commutative, it is convenient to denote the function a in R[N] as the formal sum:

and then the formulas for addition and multiplication are the familiar:

and

where the latter sum is taken over all i, j in N that sum to n.

Some authors such as  go so far as to take this monoid definition as the starting point, and regular single variable polynomials are the special case where N is the monoid of non-negative integers.  Polynomials in several variables simply take N to be the direct product of several copies of the monoid of non-negative integers.

Several interesting examples of rings and groups are formed by taking N to be the additive monoid of non-negative rational numbers, . See also Puiseux series.

Power series

Power series generalize the choice of exponent in a different direction by allowing infinitely many nonzero terms. This requires various hypotheses on the monoid N used for the exponents, to ensure that the sums in the Cauchy product are finite sums. Alternatively, a topology can be placed on the ring, and then one restricts to convergent infinite sums. For the standard choice of N, the non-negative integers, there is no trouble, and the ring of formal power series is defined as the set of functions from N to a ring R with addition component-wise, and multiplication given by the Cauchy product.

Noncommutative polynomial rings

For polynomial rings of more than one variable, the products X⋅Y and Y⋅X are simply defined to be equal.  A more general notion of polynomial ring is obtained when the distinction between these two formal products is maintained.  Formally, the polynomial ring in n noncommuting variables with coefficients in the ring R is the monoid ring R[N], where the monoid N is the free monoid on n letters, also known as the set of all strings over an alphabet of n symbols, with multiplication given by concatenation.  Neither the coefficients nor the variables need commute amongst themselves, but the coefficients and variables commute with each other.

Just as the polynomial ring in n variables with coefficients in the commutative ring R is the free commutative R-algebra of rank n, the noncommutative polynomial ring in n variables with coefficients in the commutative ring R is the free associative, unital R-algebra on n generators, which is noncommutative when n > 1.

Differential and skew-polynomial rings

Other generalizations of polynomials are differential and skew-polynomial rings.

A differential polynomial ring is a ring of differential operators formed from a ring R and a derivation δ of R into R. This derivation operates on R, and will be denoted X, when viewed as an operator. The elements of R also operate on R by multiplication. The composition of operators is denoted as the usual multiplication. It follows that the relation  may be rewritten
as
 

This relation may be extended to define a skew multiplication between two polynomials in X with coefficients in R, which make them a noncommutative ring.

The standard example, called a Weyl algebra, takes R to be a (usual) polynomial ring k[Y ], and δ to be the standard polynomial derivative . Taking a = Y in the above relation, one gets the canonical commutation relation, X⋅Y − Y⋅X = 1. Extending this relation by associativity and distributivity allows explicitly constructing the Weyl algebra. .

The skew-polynomial ring is defined similarly for a ring R and a ring endomorphism f of R, by extending the  multiplication from the relation X⋅r = f(r)⋅X to produce an associative multiplication that distributes over the standard addition. More generally, given a homomorphism F from the monoid N of the positive integers into the endomorphism ring of R, the formula X&hairsp;n⋅r = F(n)(r)⋅X&hairsp;n allows constructing a skew-polynomial ring.   Skew polynomial rings are closely related to crossed product algebras.

 Polynomial rigs 

The definition of a polynomial ring can be generalised by relaxing the requirement that the algebraic structure R be a field or a ring to the requirement that R only be a semifield or rig; the resulting polynomial structure/extension R[X''] is a polynomial rig. For example, the set of all multivariate polynomials with natural number coefficients is a polynomial rig.

See also 

 Additive polynomial
 Laurent polynomial

References

Commutative algebra
Invariant theory
Ring theory
Polynomials
Free algebraic structures